Live is a live CD and DVD by Sweetbox. It was recorded on Christmas Eve 2005, in Seoul. The DVD contains video footage of the concert as well as behind the scenes footage, the "Addicted" music video and information about the group's history, discography and band members. The CD portion of the package contains an audio version of the concert.

Track listing

Credits
Backing Vocals – Ameila Brightman, Francine Antoinette Maigue, Laura Pozo Martin
Bass – Oliver Poschmann
Directed By [Musical] – Geoman
Drums – Bertil Mark
Keyboards – Daniel Nitt, Mathias Hoderath
Vocals – Jade Villalon

Notes
First live album from the group, recorded on Christmas Eve in Seoul 2005.
On the DVD, Band Members, history and discography are all in Japanese

2006 albums
Sweetbox albums